Brigandine is a turn-based strategy game for the PlayStation video game console, created by developer Hearty Robin and released in 1998. It was released in North America by Atlus the same year, under the title Brigandine: The Legend of Forsena. In 2000, Hearty Robin released an expanded version of the game called Brigandine: Grand Edition, which included multiplayer support, along other new features. In the game, the player chooses one of the nations of the fictional continent of Forsena, and has the goal of conquering the other nations by taking their castles, using troops composed of human commanders and fictional creatures. Although primarily a strategy game, it also includes some characteristics of tactical role-playing games.

A sequel titled Brigandine: The Legend of Runersia, developed by Matrix Software and published by Happinet, released on the Nintendo Switch on June 25, 2020.

Gameplay
In Brigandine, the player controls one of the six playable nations. Each nation possess a number of troops and castles. Each troop is composed of a human leader, called rune knight, and fictional creatures such as dragons, ghouls and fairies, which are called "monsters". The goal of the player is to conquer the entire continent by attacking the enemy castles with the controlled nation's troops (or troops from allied nations). Likewise, troops are also used to protect the controlled nation's castles from enemy troops' attacks. Brigandine features two gameplay modes, both turn-based: a preparation mode and a battle mode.

Rune knights and monsters have statistics typical of role-playing video game, such as experience points,  hit points, attack, defense, magic points, and the like. Rune knights also have character classes, and may switch between classes if some conditions are met. Monsters don't have classes, but may be upgraded to more powerful forms, called promotions, when they have reached a minimum level or some special items are used. The number of monsters which may join a troop is limited by the rune knight's rune power statistic. The entire nation has a leader, called ruler, which is a rune knight with a unique class, but otherwise similar to other rune knights.

Preparation mode
In this mode, each turn is represented by a in-game "month". The player may navigate and view statistics of all castles on the continent (although only the castles of the player's nation may be managed). Each month has an organize phase and an attack phase.

In the organize phase, the player may re-allocate troops between castles, re-allocate monsters between troops, summon new monsters, equip and use items, change rune knights' classes, and promote monsters. The player may also send rune knights on quests.

To summon additional monsters, mana must be spent. Each nation receives mana at the beginning of each turn. The amount of mana depends on the number of the castles belonging to the nation. Monsters also have an upkeep cost; they consume mana every turn. Because of this, there is the option of deleting monsters.

Quest is not quite a gameplay mode, since they are not playable; they make the rune knight (and its troop) unavailable for a variable number of turns. During this time, the character is involved in events (mostly random), which may benefit or hinder the player. Rulers cannot go on quests.

In the attack phase, each nation may send its own troops to adjacent enemy castles, which is treated as an attack. If the defending castle is occupied, a battle is marked to occur between the two groups of troops, unless the castle sending the troops is attacked first (the order of attack depends on the level of the rune knights). When battles are marked to occur, the game switches into the battle mode after the organize phase.

Battle mode
In this mode, each turn is a combat round. Battles take place in hexagonal grids; each unit (rune knight or monster) occupies one hexagon. Each unit, with rare exceptions, may act once on each turn, and the units belonging to the same troop must act in sequence. A unit's action usually consists in a movement followed by a physical attack, or by a magic spell/special attack.

Each side may bring only up to 3 troops to a single battle, regardless of the number of troops that are attacking or defending the castle. Once a battle starts, the attacking side has 12 turns to gain victory, by defeating all troops of the opposing side. A troop is defeated by having its leader reduced to 0 hit points, or when the leader retreats. If the ruler of a nation is reduced to 0 hit points or retreats, all other rune knights belonging to the same side retreat. If the attacking side fails to gain victory within 12 turns, all its rune knights retreat.

In battle, each rune knight has an area around it called rune area. Outside of this area, the monsters belonging to the rune knight's troop become weaker. When a rune knight is reduced to 0 hit points or retreats, the monsters belonging to its troop may either retreat or be captured by the opposing side. A monster which is outside the leader's rune area has an increased chance of being captured.

Monsters which are reduced to 0 hit points are considered to be killed, and disappear forever. Rune knights reduced to 0 hit points become unavailable to be used for 1 in-game month, but aren't affected otherwise.

Units and magic spells frequently have elements associated with them: red, blue, green, white or black. Physical attacks and spells from units associated with a certain element are more effective against units associated with the opposing element (red opposes blue, white opposes black). Likewise, physical attacks and spells are less effective against units associated with the same element.

Plot
The game begins with a scene showing Zemeckis, commander of the army of the Kingdom of Almekia, receiving a visit from a rune knight called Cador, who wields the title of "Death Knight". Zemeckis is convinced that he is being falsely accused of treason, and decides to rebel against the King of Almekia, Henguist. Zemeckis' rebellion is joined by other rune knights, and they successfully take over the country of Almekia, renaming it Esgares Empire. King Hengust dies in the hands of Cador, and the son of the King, Prince Lance, flees to the nearby Kingdom of Padstow with the rune knights who stayed loyal to the deceased king. These events are the trigger for the war between the countries of Forsena.

Playable nations
 New Almekia: The former Kingdom of Padstow, which was an ally of Almekia. King Coel abdicated the throne in favor of Prince Lance, who becomes the ruler of nation, renamed West Almekia (New Almekia in the American port of the game). Lance desires to fight to avenge his father and take back the kingdom which was stolen from him.
 Caerleon: Known as "Magic Kingdom", Caerleon is a small country with powerful magic wielders. Caerleon allies itself with New Almekia early in the game. The ruler of the nation, Cai, is a powerful spellcaster and is known as the "Silent Wise King", who brings his country to war for the best of his people.
 Norgard: An icy and large country in the north. The nation was weakened after losing a war against Almekia in the past, but now the new ruler, Vaynard, desires to restore his country to glory by conquering the entire continent. Vaynard is a brilliant strategist and known as the "White Wolf" for his bravery.
 Iscalio: A chaotic country, filled with daily parties and celebrations. Its ruler is a tyrant named Dryst, who is also called "The Mad Monarch" due to his utter insanity. Dryst desires to wage war and conquer the entire continent of Forsena simply for fun.
 Leonia: A religious and peaceful country, which ends up in the war just to protect itself. Its ruler, Queen Lyonesse, was a former village girl who became a ruler after being appointed by the prophecy.
 Esgares Empire: The former Kingdom of Almekia, whose new ruler is now Emperor Zemeckis. Zemeckis doesn't have the ambition of power - he desires to conquer Forsena just because fighting is his only way of living. Unlike the other countries, Esgares is not normally playable; a cheat code must be used to control it. The Esgares game also has no plot cut scenes. However, some of the characters within the Esgares Empire have special quests, such as the twins Mira and Millet.

Brigandine: Grand Edition
The expanded version of the game released in 2000 had many significant changes, including:
 Multiplayer game mode: allowing up to 6 players, each controlling a nation;
 The Esgares Empire became a fully playable nation, and gained plot cut scenes;
 Changes on battle mode gameplay:
 Like in the Fire Emblem series, elements became based on the Rock, Paper, Scissors rule: red is effective against green, green is effective against blue, and blue is effective against red. White and black still oppose each other;
 If, after 12 turns of battle, the attacking side has a unit over the defending side's castle, the attacking side now wins.
 Monsters became able to equip items;
 The player is redirected to a final boss, when the continent is successfully conquered;
 The original 3D opening was replaced by an anime opening;
 Many dialog-only cut scenes were replaced by anime cut scenes;
 3D battle animations replaced by simpler and faster 2D animations;
 Major changes to the soundtrack;
 New rune knights, character classes, items and monsters.
 Japanese voice acting was added, including the voice talents of Sōichirō Hoshi, Mitsuaki Madono and Yuri Shiratori.

Development
Hearty Robin, then known as Easlystaff, demonstrated the game at the September 1997 Tokyo Game Show.

References

External links

1998 video games
Atlus games
Fantasy video games
Multiplayer and single-player video games
PlayStation (console) games
PlayStation Network games
Tactical role-playing video games
Turn-based strategy video games
Video games developed in Japan